Viry may refer to:

Communes of France
 Viry, Jura
 Viry, Saône-et-Loire
 Viry, Haute-Savoie
 Viry-Châtillon, Essonne
 Viry-Noureuil, Aisne
 Saint-Parize-en-Viry, Nièvre

People 
 Stéphane Viry (born 1969), French politician